Opalinata is a superclass of non-phagotrophic heterokonts that unites the classes Opalinea and Blastocystea, and is the sister group to Opalomonadea.

Description
When Opalinata was first erected as a taxon in 1926, it was placed as the sole class in the group "Protociliata" and considered as primitive ciliates due to the fact that they move thanks to their numerous cilia and that they both present two nuclei. They were distinguished because they perform syngamy by the complete fusion of uninucleated gametes, while the rest of ciliates, forming "Euciliata" (Ciliata + Suctoria), perform syngamy through their micronuclei alone while their macronuclei dissolve.

The taxon Opalinata was revised in 1996 by Cavalier-Smith and placed in Opalozoa, and is now defined by the following synapomorphies: gut parasitism and the loss of peroxisomes and phagocytosis.

Phylogeny
The cladogram below shows the relationships between Opalinata and the rest of Opalozoa.

Classification
The modern taxonomy of Opalinata is as follows:
 Phylum Bigyra
 Subphylum Opalozoa Cavalier-Smith, 1991 stat. n. 2006 em.
 Infraphylum Placidozoa Cavalier-Smith 2013
 Superclass Opalinata Wenyon, 1926 em. Cavalier-Smith, 1996 stat. n. 2006
 Class Opalinea Wenyon, 1926 stat. n. Cavalier-Smith, 1993 em. 2013
 Order Proteromonadida Grassé, 1952 em. Cavalier-Smith, 1993
 Family Proteromonadidae Grassé, 1952 (Proteromonas)
 Order Opalinida Poche, 1913 stat. n. Hall, 1953 em. Cavalier-Smith
 Family Karotomorphidae Travis, 1934 (Karotomorpha)
 Family Opalinidae Claus, 1874 (e.g. Cepedea, Protoopalina, Opalina)
 Class Blastocystea Zierdt et al., 1967
 Order Blastocystida Zierdt, 1978
 Family Blastocystidae Jiang and He, 1988 (type genus Blastocystis Aléxéieff, 1911)

References

Placidozoa